Petronella Wilhelmina Cornelia Penninx (born 14 September 1971 in Loosdrecht, North Holland) is a retired rower from the Netherlands. She won a silver medal in the women's eight with coxswain in the 2000 Summer Olympics in Sydney, Australia. Four years earlier, at the 1996 Summer Olympics in Atlanta, United States, Penninx finished sixth in the women’s quadruple sculls.

References
  Dutch Olympic Committee

1971 births
Living people
People from Wijdemeren
Dutch female rowers
Rowers at the 1996 Summer Olympics
Rowers at the 2000 Summer Olympics
Olympic rowers of the Netherlands
Olympic silver medalists for the Netherlands
Olympic medalists in rowing
Medalists at the 2000 Summer Olympics
Sportspeople from North Holland
20th-century Dutch women
21st-century Dutch women